Marie Ney 18 July 1895, in Chelsea, London – 11 April 1981, in London) was a British character actress who had an acting career spanning five decades, from 1919 to 1969, encompassing both stage and screen.

Early life 
Ney was born in London, and as a young child, went with her family to live in New Zealand. She began her acting career in that country, and continued it in Australia.

Early roles
After several years of performing in those two countries, she moved back to her native Britain, where she acted at the Old Vic with many famous actors of the day such as Michael Redgrave and Robert Donat.

In 1930, Ney played Lady de Winter in the musical The Three Musketeers at the Theatre Royal, Drury Lane in London.

Career: Film and stage  
Ney's first film appearance was in Desert Gold (1919), a silent film made in Australia. She appeared in 11 films during the 1930s, including The Wandering Jew, Scrooge (1935), Brief Ecstasy (1937), Jamaica Inn (1939), and A People Eternal (1939). In 1941, Ney returned to Australia for a six-month season, appearing in the plays No Time for Comedy, Noël Coward's Private Lives, and Ladies in Retirement in Sydney and Melbourne. She appeared in the 1948 play Rain on the Just in London, and in 1959 The Last Word at the Royal Lyceum Theatre in Edinburgh.

In the 1950s, she appeared in the films Shadow of the Past (1950), Seven Days to Noon (1950), The Lavender Hill Mob (1951), Simba (1955), Yield to the Night (1956), and The Surgeon's Knife (1957).  
 
In the 1950s, Ney had also moved into television roles, appearing in episodes of ITV's ITV Television Playhouse, ITV Play of the Week, and Armchair Theatre.

In 1960, she appeared in the Greek film Eroica, and in an episode of Maigret. Her last credited screen appearance was in the ITV Playhouse episode Remember the Germans (1969).

Personal life 
Ney was married to Thomas Menzies, and was active in the union Equity. She was a collector of art and books. Ney died in London in April 1981 aged 85.

Partial filmography
 Desert Gold (1919)
 Escape (1930) as Grace
 Stürmisch die Nacht (1931)
 The Wandering Jew (1933) as Judith
 Home, Sweet Home (1933) as Constance Pelham
 Scrooge (1935) as Spirit of Christmas Past (uncredited)
 Brief Ecstasy (1937) as Martha Russell
 Jamaica Inn (1939) as Patience Merlyn
 Uneasy Terms (1948) as Honoria Wymering
 Conspirator (1949) as Lady Pennistone
 The Romantic Age (1949) as Miss Hallam
 Shadow of the Past (1950) as Mrs. Bentley
 Seven Days to Noon (1950) as Mrs. Willingdon
 The Lavender Hill Mob (1951) as School Headmistress (uncredited)
 Night Was Our Friend (1951) as Emily Raynor
 Simba (1955) as Mrs. Crawford
 Yield to the Night (1956) as Governor
 The Surgeon's Knife (1957) as Matron Fiske
 Our Last Spring (1960)
 West 11 (1963) as Mildred Dyce
 Witchcraft (1964) as Malvina Lanier

References

External links
 
 Ney Film Biography on Time Out
 Ney on 'Radio and TV Personalities'
 Images of Ney on Getty Images

1895 births
1981 deaths
People from Chelsea, London
English film actresses
English stage actresses
English television actresses
20th-century English actresses